Ton Pentre railway station is a railway station serving the village of Ton Pentre in Rhondda Cynon Taf, Wales. It is located on the Rhondda Line.

History
The station was opened by the Taff Vale Railway (TVR) on 4 February 1861. The TVR amalgamated with the Great Western Railway at the start of 1922, and the GWR renamed the station Ystrad (Rhondda) in December 1930. On 29 September 1986, the station was renamed Ton Pentre, when new station buildings were opened.

Services
Monday-Saturday, there is a half-hourly service to  southbound and to  northbound. There is an hourly service in the late evening and a two-hourly service in each direction on Sundays. On 20 July 2018, previous franchise operator Arriva Trains Wales announced a trial period of extra Sunday services on the Rhondda Line to Cardiff and Barry Island. This was in response to a survey by Leanne Wood and the success of extra Sunday services on the Merthyr Line and the Rhymney Line.

References

External links

Railway stations in Rhondda Cynon Taf
DfT Category F2 stations
Former Taff Vale Railway stations
Railway stations in Great Britain opened in 1861
Railway stations served by Transport for Wales Rail
1861 establishments in Wales